Leptaulus is a genus of trees and shrubs in the family Cardiopteridaceae described as a genus in 1862. It is native to tropical Africa including Madagascar.

Species

References

Cardiopteridaceae
Asterid genera
Flora of Africa